A-mount or A mount may refer to:

 Minolta A-mount (α/Dynax/Maxxum), a partially electronic bayonet lens mount for 35mm film autofocus SLR cameras introduced by Minolta in 1985
 Agfa A-mount, the same mount by Agfa for the ActionCam in 1995
 Konica Minolta A-mount (α/Dynax/Maxxum), the same mount also for DSLRs between 2003 and 2006
 Sony A-mount (α), the same camera mount since 2006
 Hasselblad A-mount, the same camera mount for SLT cameras since 2014
 Carl Zeiss A-mount (ZA), lenses designed for A-mount cameras

See also 
 E-mount (disambiguation)
 V-mount (disambiguation)

 A-mount cameras
 A-mount lenses